Hacısəmədli  (also, Hacısamədli and Gadzhysamedli) is a village and municipality in the Agsu Rayon of Azerbaijan.  It has a population of 431.

References 

Populated places in Agsu District